SS John Witherspoon was a Liberty ship built in the United States during World War II. She was named after John Witherspoon, a Scottish-American Presbyterian minister and a Founding Father of the United States. Politically active, Witherspoon was a delegate from New Jersey to the Second Continental Congress and a signatory to the United States Declaration of Independence. Later, he signed the Articles of Confederation and supported ratification of the Constitution. In 1789 he was convening moderator of the First General Assembly of the Presbyterian Church in the United States of America.

Construction
John Witherspoon was laid down on 10 December 1941, under a Maritime Commission (MARCOM) contract, MCE hull 31, by the Bethlehem-Fairfield Shipyard, Baltimore, Maryland; sponsored by Miss Grace Rose Culleton, the daughter of J.C. Dulleton, the resident MARCOM plant auditor, and was launched on 4 March 1942.

History
She was allocated to Seas Shipping Co.Inc., on 23 April 1942.

Sinking

John Witherspoon had set out from Baltimore, on her maiden voyage, in June 1942. The torpedo struck her starboard side between holds #4 and #5. A minute later another torpedo struck beneath the bridge. All eight officers, 31 crewmen, and 11 Armed guards abandoned ship at this time, with one crewman falling overboard and drowning. At 16:55, another two torpedoes struck the port side amidships, this caused her to brake in two and sink within minutes. U-255 approached the lifeboats to question the captain, John Stewart Clark, about her cargo, afterwards offering food and water to the survivors and directions to the nearest land.

The merchant ship , picked up 19 of the survivors on 8 July, with  picking up the rest of survivors on 9 July.

References

Bibliography

 
 
 
 
 
 

 

Liberty ships
Ships built in Baltimore
1942 ships
Ships sunk by German submarines in World War II
World War II shipwrecks in the Arctic Ocean
Ships named for Founding Fathers of the United States